Wiersma is a surname of West Frisian origin. It originated as a patronymic surname, "son of Wier", an old Frisian name that was a contraction of German -wig- ("battle") and -her- ("lord").  Notable people with the surname include:

 (1858–1940), Dutch neurologist and psychiatrist (Bourdon–Wiersma test)
 (1894–1984), Dutch racing cyclist
Harm Wiersma (born 1953), Dutch draughts player
 (1878–1965), Dutch painter and illustrator
Jan Marinus Wiersma (born 1951), Dutch politician
Jelmer Wiersma, Dutch heavy-metal guitarist
 (1917–1993), Dutch politician
Roel Wiersma (1932–1995), Dutch  footballer

See also
Wiersema

References

Surnames of Frisian origin
Patronymic surnames